"Not at All" is a single released by the British Rock band Status Quo in 1989. It was included on the album Perfect Remedy.

Track listing

7 inch 
 "Not at All" (Rossi/Frost) (2.51)
 "Gone Thru The Slips" (Bown) (3.39)

12 inch 
 "Not at All" (Rossi/Frost) (2.51)
 "Everytime I Think Of You" (Rich/Edwards/Paxman) (3.48)
 "Gone Thru The Slips" (Bown) (3.39)

Cassette 
 "Not at All" (Rossi/Frost) (2.51)
 "Gone Thru The Slips" (Bown) (3.39)

CD 
 "Not at All" (Rossi/Frost) (2.51)
 "Everytime I Think Of You" (Rich/Edwards/Paxman) (3.48)
 "Gone Thru The Slips" (Bown) (3.39)

Charts

References 

Status Quo (band) songs
1989 singles
Songs written by Francis Rossi
Song recordings produced by Pip Williams
1989 songs
Vertigo Records singles